Yandovy is a rural locality (a village) in Mstyora Urban Settlement, Vyaznikovsky District, Vladimir Oblast, Russia. The population was one as of 2010.

Geography 
Yandovy is located 16 km northwest of Vyazniki (the district's administrative centre) by road. Kostenevo is the nearest rural locality.

References 

Rural localities in Vyaznikovsky District